Kagbeni is a 2008 Nepali movie, loosely based on W. W. Jacobs's 1902 horror short story The Monkey's Paw. Kagbeni is the directorial debut of Bhusan Dahal. The name of the movie is taken from a tourist place Kagbeni situated in the valley of the Kali Gandaki, which is a 2-hour side trek from Muktinath. Kagbeni is considered to be a movie which changed the way people look at Nepali cinema, because it is seen as first successful non-commercial movie in Nepal which was able to leave its mark in the film industry. In present time, non-commercial movies are often described as 'post- Kagbeni era films' by Nepali critics. Kagbeni was one of the few Nepali films during its time to manifest cinematography as one of the important elements in cinema.

Plot

Krishna (Nima Rumba) returns from Malaysia to a village (Kagbeni) to meet Ramesh (Saugat Malla) and Bishnu (Hanif Mohammed) who have been his childhood friends. On the way, Krishna encounters a mysterious woman who attempts to give him an important message. But Krishna warns the woman to leave him alone, and runs away. Krishna finally arrives and meets Ramesh, who runs a small liquor business. Although the money he earns is able to fulfill his basic needs to eat and survive, he's not satisfied. He says that life is not easy as he had thought. Krishna says that although there is money in Malaysia, there is also hard work and suggests Ramesh to send his liquor to town to sell for more profit. Ramesh tells Krishna that he's going to a neighboring village Marpha and Krishna tags along to meet Amo (his aunt).
 
On their way to Marpha, they stop at a cave for the night. A strange hermit appears shortly. Krishna hands him the blanket that he's brought from Malaysia for Amo and asks to come near fire. In return, the hermit hands him a monkey's paw, which he claims to be magical. The hermit explains that the paw can fulfill the owner's wish but can bring a great disaster if anyone other than its owner uses it.

They finish their business in Marpha and return. While returning, they come across an inn where they meet Pema (Pooja Gurung) and drink for a while. Krishna flirts with the girl. He also talks about marriage and that he's got a photo of the girl with whom his parents are talking for his marriage. Pema tells them that the girl in the photo is Tara (Deeya Maskey) and that she knows her and that someone else also wants to marry her. When Ramesh sees her photo, he frowns for he is the guy who wants to marry her. He is distressed and doesn't talk much.

That night, they do not move ahead. Ramesh wakes up in the middle of the night, takes the paw from Krishna and makes a wish to get Tara, not realizing its consequence. While getting back, Ramesh doesn't talk much. Sometime later, as Krishna takes the monkey's paw in his hand, he loses his balance because the mules tremble when they see it. He falls off the hill in spite of Ramesh's efforts to save him with a rope.

The story then moves nine years later. Ramesh is married now with Tara and has got a son Bardaan (Vivek Gurung). Their business has grown up. One day, Ramesh is offered a contract by a trader from the town. He demands 5000 bottles of liquor in three months. In return, he assures Rs. 1,37,000 in advance. Tara insists to hire two to three guys for the work, but he tells her instead of that he's going to buy an apple crusher from town.

Ramesh brings machine from town, teaches Tara to use it and is able to make some 500 bottles in two and a half months. One day as they are ready to sleep, Tara tells Ramesh that there is some friend to see Ramesh. Ramesh is surprised to see Krishna. Krishna tells him that he survived unlike everyone thought. Krishna asks Tara to get a cigarette and a lighter from his bag, but she is scared to find a monkey's paw when she takes the cigarette out. Ramesh is amazed to see the paw still with him. He explains to Tara that the paw had power to fulfill one's wish. Meanwhile, Tara's watch stops running. That night, Ramesh remembers everything again and the next day, they are amazed to see Krishna not in his room. The main door is locked from inside. While sweeping the floor, she finds the paw under the bed and keeps it with her.

That night, there is a big storm and heavy rainfall which causes all the apples in his field and the whole village to fall down before ripening. So, he worries that he won't be able to make the remaining liquors as per the deal. When the trader comes back, Ramesh requests him for one extra month for the remaining bottles, but the trader gives him only two weeks and tells him that he'd have to return the money given in advance if he can't make it. 

Seeing the deteriorating situation at home, Tara makes a wish to solve the problem. The next day, their son Bardaan is run over by a tractor and dies. Both Ramesh and Tara are very much saddened by the incident. However, they get 1,50,000 as a compensation from the owner of the tractor. Ramesh is able to give the trader all the money he owes through this, but the trader denies taking the interest feeling sorry about the death of their son. One day, while going to bed, Tara tells Ramesh that the paw works as she'd wished to solve the problem. She cries and demands her son back. Ramesh fights with her not to use the paw again, but she makes a wish to return their son. Suddenly, there is a tap on the door. But Ramesh struggles to get the paw from her and wishes they don't want their son back. When Tara opens the door, there is no one.

As Ramesh decides to get rid of the paw forever, he makes one final wish that he'll never use it again. The paw is picked up by Bardaan, who disappears with a flash. The mysterious woman now walks somewhere as if her mission has been accomplished.

Production 

The filmmakers brought high-definition digital cameras from Silicon Imaging, an American company that was just starting out. The cast and crew set off to Jomsom in October 2006 and shot for thirty days non-stop in Kagbeni, Jomsom, Marpha, and Shyang in Mustang district of Nepal.

There were some technical problems in the making of the film as it was the first time the film makers were using the camera. They had to walk a few hours to a cyber café to ask the company for instructions.

Cast
Saugat Malla as Ramesh
Deeya Maskey as Tara
Nima Rumba as Krishna
Hanif Mohammed as Bishnu
Pooja Gurung as Pema
Vivek Gurung as Bardaan

Crew

 Director: Bhusan Dahal
 Producer: Nakim Uddin, Rajesh Siddhi, Bhaskar Dhungana
 Script: Achyut Koirala, Samitya Timilsina
 Story: Bhaskar Dhungana
 Screenplay: Prashant Rasaily
 Cinematography: Bidur Pandey
 Background Music: Sharad Gurung
 Location Sound: Jyoti Rana
 Editors: Prabod Shrestha, Prabin Manandhar, Prakash Tuladhar
 Casting: Anup Baral
 Promotional Music: 1974 AD

Critical reception

The film received mostly glowing reviews from critics. The Himalayan Times hailed it "a benchmark for Nepali films." While Kunda Dixit of Nepali Times called it "superbly crafted, seductively acted, meticulously directed," adding, "No longer will we have to be embarrassed about Nepali movies." Bishnu Gautam of The Rising Nepal joining in the choir, wrote, "It is not easy to bring out an impressive film with new faces, but Bhusan did it brilliantly. All the three protagonists, Saugat Malla (Ramesh), Deeya Maskey (Tara) and Nima Rumba (Krishna) are new faces but nowhere in Kagbeni are they seen as novices... It provides you with the taste of western films including the love scenes, which are free from vulgarities." Sanjog Rai of The Kathmandu Post, however, was the sole voice in panning the film, suggesting that it "harbingers the end of the digital delusion," elaborating on the trend of putting it "up for sainthood; it's almost as if the masses believe it is a beacon of ingenuity, and that it will single-handedly save Nepali cinema." His complaints included Quest Entertainment's excessive hype of the film, which had gone for more than a year before the film's release, the sound, which made him jump "even if the scenes were by no means frightening," the editing and the poor adaption, which he writes "hasn't much to sustain anyone's interest besides the naturally gorgeous scenes shot in Kagbeni, Jomsom, Syang and Marpha."

Influence

Kagbeni was expected to be a trend-setting Nepali film with new taste of technology and story for the Nepali audience, which it did to some extent. Although the cinema halls didn't see the response as was expected, it started off really good with a new director and actors. Bhusan Dahal was a music video director and this was his debut film. Saugat Malla and Deeya Maskey are well-known theatre actors. Nima Rumba is a popular Nepali singer. The movie was also hyped for its sizzling kissing scene between the two lead actors.

After Kagbeni, there have been some new movies of the same quality. Sano Sansar by music video director Alok Nembang is based on youths in the city and Mission Paisa is an action movie. Dasdhunga, an investigation-based movie on the mysterious death of Madan Bhandari and Jiv Raj Ashrit in 2050 BS, and 13246, a documentary-cum-movie on the decade-long Maoist conflict in Nepal, followed the trend set by Kagbeni. Dasdhunga was directed by Manoj Pandit and 13246 by Apil Bista.

Box office

The film was released in Nepal on 10 January 2008. The film got a phenomenal response in the urban areas like Kathmandu, Pokhara, Narayangarh, etc. while the rural areas had decent collections. The movie collected Rs 40 lacs in its opening week, thus creating a new history in the Nepali cinema industry. The film grossed about Rs 3 crores from its theatrical run. The film did well in the international market too, especially in the United States, the United Kingdom and Hong Kong where the Nepalese population is in decent number.

Awards 

Kagbeni was selected in some of the international film festivals.

 Shanghai International Film Festival 2008: Official Selection
 Mumbai International Film Festival 2008: Official Selection
 Hyderabad International Film Festival 2008: Official Selection

References

External links

2008 horror films
2008 films
2000s Nepali-language films
Films based on works by W. W. Jacobs
Films based on short fiction
2008 directorial debut films
Nepalese coming-of-age films
Nepalese horror films